The Great West Hockey Conference was a short-lived NCAA Division I college ice hockey conference.  The conference was formed in 1985 by the four D-I independent schools west of the Rocky Mountains: the University of Alaska Anchorage, the University of Alaska Fairbanks, Northern Arizona University, and US International University; in an effort to ease scheduling issues.

The teams played a 12-game schedule in the 1985–86 season, with US International winning the championship. Northern Arizona dropped their hockey program after the season when their venue, the Walkup Skydome, required numerous repairs to the ice rink.  The three remaining teams played two more seasons, with Alaska–Anchorage winning the 1986–87 championship, and Alaska–Fairbanks winning in 1987–88.

During the 1987–88 season, the conference announced intentions to expand to 9 teams and gain an automatic bid to the NCAA Men's Ice Hockey Championship.  They invited three schools who had recently moved up from Division II: Alabama–Huntsville, Merrimack, and St. Cloud State; however, none of the schools joined.  At the end of the season, US International dropped its varsity hockey program, citing high travel costs; three years later, the university declared bankruptcy.

With only two teams remaining, the conference dissolved.  The two Alaska schools competed as independents until 1993, when Anchorage joined the Western Collegiate Hockey Association and Fairbanks joined the Central Collegiate Hockey Association. After the CCHA disbanded at the end of the 2012–13 season due to major conference realignment, the Alaska schools reunited in the WCHA.

Members

References

Defunct NCAA Division I conferences
Defunct NCAA Division I ice hockey conferences
Sports in the Western United States